Fort Street High School (FSHS) is a government-funded co-educational academically selective secondary day school, located in Petersham, an inner western suburb of Sydney, New South Wales, Australia. Established in 1849, it is the oldest government high school in Australia and, notably, the first school not founded by a religious organisation. Today, it remains a public school operated by the New South Wales Department of Education. As an academically selective secondary school, it draws students from across greater metropolitan Sydney.

To avoid confusion arising from the school's history of separation, amalgamation and relocation, the present school is designated Fort Street High School, Petersham for official government purposes.

The school's Latin motto is Faber est suae quisque fortunae, translated as "Each person is the maker of their own fortune", a phrase attributed to the ancient Roman Appius Claudius Caecus.

Fort Street High School has a sister school, Suginami Sogo High School, in Tokyo, Japan.

In 2010, The Age reported that Fort Street High School ranked equal fourth among Australian schools, based on the number of alumni who had been honoured as a Companion of the Order of Australia (AC).

History

Creation of the Fort Street Model School

The history of public education in Australia began when the Governor of New South Wales Charles FitzRoy established a Board of National Education on 8 January 1848 to implement a national system of education throughout the Colony. The board decided to create two model schools, one for boys and one for girls. The site of Fort Street Model School was chosen as the old Military Hospital at Fort Phillip, on Sydney's Observatory Hill. This school was not only intended to educate boys and girls, but also to serve as a model for other schools in the Colony. The school's name is derived from the name of a street which ran into the grounds of the hospital and became part of the playground during its reconstruction. The street name is perpetuated in the small street in Petersham that leads to the present school.

Establishment of Fort Street

The school was officially established on 1 September 1841, when the conversion of the building was approved by the government. This original school building is visible today beside the southern approaches to the Sydney Harbour Bridge. The establishment of Fort Street School marked the establishment of a non-denominational system of school, where the government undertook the education of its people, separate from religion. The influence of the Fort Street Model School was substantial, forming the basis for education throughout the colonies:

At the same time at the Fort Street National School in Sydney William Wilkins was teaching pupil-teachers how to lead the children of New South Wales out of darkness into the light. He was holding out to them that bright prospect of the day when every locality however remote and every family however humble was supplied with the ameliorating influences of an education, which would teach every man, woman and child in the colony to form the habits of regularity, cleanliness, orderly behaviour, and regard for the rights of both public and private property, as well as the habit of obedience to the law, and respect for duly constituted authority. In Melbourne, Adelaide and Hobart his counterparts were preaching the same gospel of humanity marching forward, reaching upward for the light. – Manning Clark, A History of Australia, Vol. 4, The Earth Abideth Forever 1851–1888

In 1881, the school was raised to the status of Superior Public School.

Formation of Fort Street Public, Boys' High, and Girls' High Schools
In 1911, the school was split into one primary and two secondary schools: Fort Street Public School, Fort Street Boys' High School and Fort Street Girls' High School. Due to space limitations at Observatory Hill, in 1916, the Boys' school was moved to the school's present site, on Taverner's Hill, Petersham. The Girls' school remained at Observatory Hill until 1975, when the two schools were amalgamated to form the current co-educational school at Petersham. During that time, its grounds continued to be consumed by the growing city; for example, the Sydney Harbour Bridge, which opened in 1932, took most of the playground. Fort Street Public School remains at Observatory Hill.

For many years from 1912 George Mackaness was the English master and deputy headmaster at Fort Street Boys' High School. He published Inspirational Teaching (1928) on his teaching techniques.<ref>Martha Rutledge and Bruce Mitchell, Mackaness, George (1882–1968), Australian Dictionary of Biography, adb.anu.edu.au. Retrieved 22 April 2022.</ref>

Recent
The school celebrated its sesquicentenary in 1999. Its student population is now a diverse one; students come from over 100 suburbs in Sydney, from places as far as Hornsby, the Blue Mountains, Cabramatta, Fairfield and Canterbury, and a range of cultural backgrounds. Students past and present are referred to as "Fortians".

Ronald Horan was for many years a master at the school. As well as writing foreign language textbooks, he was the author of a history of the school, Fort Street, the School which was later followed by Maroon and Silver.

The school has also undergone a variety of renovations, elevating the facilities of the school.

The school was closed on 30 July 2020 during the COVID-19 pandemic after the school was advised of a possible case. The school was reopened the next day after a negative result was returned.

Campus
Fort Street High School is located on a single campus adjacent to Parramatta Road in Petersham, a suburb in the inner-west of Sydney. The school occupies almost the entire street block, and is surrounded by Parramatta Road, Palace Street and Andreas Street with access from Fort Street.

The Petersham campus centres on the Romanesque Revival main building (formerly known to most staff and students simply as "the old block") now named the Wilkins Building after William Wilkins, who played an instrumental role in the formation of the education system in New South Wales in the latter half of the nineteenth century. The other buildings include the Kilgour building, the Memorial Hall and the newest additions, the Cohen and Rowe buildings, which were completed in 2004.

School facilities include a library, a gymnasium, an oval, futsal courts, basketball courts, cricket practice nets, a canteen, a STEM makerspace and a performing arts block.

After years of campaigning for insulation, the school received funding for noise reduction technology, as it is located beneath an air corridor. Work on in the school was scheduled to start in mid-2010 and began in the Memorial Hall at the request of the school principal, Roslynne Moxham, to provide a quiet environment for exams being held in the hall including the Higher School Certificate. It was completed in January 2012, with the completion of insulation in the Wilkins and Kilgour blocks.

The school's original Observatory Hill campus is now used by the National Trust of Australia.

Academics
Fort Street High School teaches all six grades of a standard secondary education in New South Wales, from year 7 to 12. It operates under the New South Wales Department of Education and Training (DET) and is registered and accredited with the New South Wales Education Standards Authority, and therefore following the mandated curriculum for all years. Administratively, the six grades are divided into three "Stages" of two years each: Stage 4 (years 7 and 8), Stage 5 (years 9 and 10) and Stage 6 (years 11 and 12).

Years 7 to 10 are traditionally regarded as "junior" high school, and officially conclude with attainment of the School Certificate at the end of year 10. Compulsory subjects during these years are English, Mathematics, Science, History, Geography and Physical Education. In addition, Visual Arts, Drama, and Design & Technology are compulsory in years 7 and 8. Additionally, students learn two different languages in years 7 and 8. They may choose from French, German, Latin, Chinese and Japanese.

In years 9 and 10, students choose three elective subjects, from amongst Languages (Latin, French, German, Chinese, or Japanese), Elective History, Elective Geography (so-called to differentiate them from the compulsory History and Geography course), Performing Arts (Music, Drama and Visual Arts), Industrial Technologies (ICT, Woodwork, Electronics, and Food Technology), and Commerce. Accelerated Maths and Business Studies, which are both accelerated subjects, can also be chosen.

In Stage 6, or years 11 and 12, students prepare for the Higher School Certificate (HSC), which certifies the completion of high school in New South Wales. In order to satisfy requirements for the HSC, each student must complete at least twelve units of study for the Preliminary course (in year 11) and at least ten units for the HSC (in Year 12). The only compulsory subject is English. Students have the option of undertaking Vocational education (VET) courses, which may or may not contribute to their Australian Tertiary Admission Rank (ATAR) in the HSC.

Extra-curricular activities
Sport
Fort Street High also offers sports as part of its formal and co-curricular programs. Year 7 to 10 students experience sports through the Physical Education program, and Years 8 to 11 have the option to participate in zone and knockout sports. Year 12 students are not required to undertake sport but may partake if requested. Students who are not involved in competition undertake in Year 8 skill-based sport, and in Years 9 to 11 recreational sports. Sports offered include Ultimate Frisbee, hockey, rugby union, aerobics, basketball, ice skating, netball, soccer, water polo, cricket, squash, quidditch, bocce, tennis, fencing, baseball, volleyball, recreational gym, Oz-tag, rock climbing and touch football.

Instrumental Music Program (IMP)
The Instrumental Music Program is the largest co-curricular program in the school involving over 300 students. In 2002, it won the Director-General's School Achievement Award for providing opportunities for students to enrich and expand their expertise as musicians and performers. The large ensembles include the Wind Ensemble, Wind Orchestra, Concert Band, Training Band, Symphony Orchestra, Philharmonic Orchestra and Vocal Ensemble. In addition, the extension ensembles include the Jazz Orchestra, Big Band, Jazz Ensemble, Percussion Ensembles, and Chamber Choir.

Charity Committees
Each year group has a charity committee, focusing on different issues and charities throughout the year. They often hold highly successful fundraising stalls, such as cake stalls, student hairspray salons, live entertainment, raffles and gold-coin donation drives. In 2015, the Year 8 Charity Committee (class of 2019) established a team to participate in the annual Seven Bridges Walk, raising over $21,100. They have since established this as an annual tradition, where over $88,351 has been raised by the Year 8 Charity Committees from 2015-2019 inclusive. 

It is also a tradition for the Year 12 Charity Committee to run the World's Greatest Shave, an annual fundraiser run by the Leukaemia Foundation which raises awareness and funds for blood cancer research and treatment. 

Robotics Club (FSHS Robotics)
FSHS Robotics is a student-run robotics club with the aim of providing students passionate in STEM with a holistic experience of engineering from conception to production in preparation for the RoboCup Junior Australia (RCJA) competition. Reaping many awards and trophies from student innovation and competition on a state and national level, students primarily compete in the RCJA competition in teams consisting of 2-5 members with fully autonomous robots that they design, construct and program.

 Chess 
Fort Street High School offers chess as an extracurricular activity after school. Fort Street High School participates in the Metropolitan Secondary Schools Competition, a weekly inter school teams competition between secondary schools, both independent and government-funded, offered by the NSW Junior Chess League. In 2009, the senior Fort Street team became the champions of the Metropolitan Secondary Schools Competition. In 2021, the senior Fort Street team had advanced to the regional stage of the Metropolitan Secondary Schools Competition, but a surge in COVID-19 cases caused the remainder of games to be postponed indefinitely.

Maker Society
The Fort Street High School Maker Society is a co-curricular group where students can complete a variety of STEM activities. Students choose one or more STEM-related activities such as the Aeronautical Velocity, STEM Video Game or Formula 1 in Schools challenges and work on the activity during Maker Society sessions, all under the supervision and guidance of the TAS (Technology and Applied studies) teachers. It provides a social hub to inspire students to start their own projects, as well as a makerspace which contains facilities such as a laser cutter, multiple 3D printers, a CNC machine and various electronic test equipment.

Student Representative Council (SRC)
The student body is represented by the Student Representative Council (SRC). Four male and four female students from each year are elected by their peers at the end of the third term of each year, excepting Year 7 Representatives, who are voted in the beginning of the year. The executive team is elected from Year 10 members of the SRC at the beginning of Term 4. It consists of a president, vice-president, secretary, and treasurer, and is elected by a combination of weighted votes from the school's teachers, members of the SRC, and members of Year 10.

The SRC is responsible for the annual Valentine's Day Rose Drive and a Year 7 and 8 welcome dance, and are exploring more active fundraising for charity. Recently, the SRC have been aiming towards fundraising to the local community, such as OASIS, a project run by the Salvation Army in Australia, and White Ribbon Australia, helping to prevent violence against women. Two delegated SRC members sit on the Fort Street High School Council (the oligarchical governing body of the school) and assist in broader decision-making processes.

The SRC also run the biennial Fort Street Festival (Fort Fest), which allows students to open a stall at the school on the day, usually a Sunday at the beginning of June.  It features a Talent Quest (previously the Battle of the Bands), a program where individuals and groups compete to win prizes. There are stalls from various student groups, including the Environment Committee, the Student Anti-Racism Network, and Amnesty International. In 2010, other stalls included Nova 96.9, NSW Police and the NSW Fire Department.

Environment Committee
The Environment Committee is a student body that was formed in late 2007 by Paul Pagani, a teacher at the school. The Committee currently has over 40 members ranging from Years 7 to 11, and is led by a President. The Environment Committee works in partnership with other schools in the local area, such as Petersham Public School and Newtown High School of the Performing Arts. In a nod towards the school's heritage, the Committee worked closely with the Observatory Hill Environmental Educational Centre, including the planning of EcoTour 2010. The Committee's past and present projects include running a Recycling Program run with the assistance of Visy Industries, installing two Water Tanks (each having a 2000L capacity), installing 6 1.5 kW Solar Panels, regenerating plants with indigenous natives along Andreas Street, controlling a worm farm and running the annual Earth Hour. Future projects include a vegetable patch, a herb garden new water bottle refill stations and further recycling of aluminium and plastic.

STIVE
For more than 20 years, Fort Street High School has supported a student led and mentored, voluntary Christian program called STIVE.

Walking Club
The Fort Street High School Walking Club is a group where students participate in a range of high intensity exercises. Students exercise on the oval on Tuesday lunches, providing an outlet for community fitness and welfare.

Other
Other extracurricular activities include debating (the Year 7 and 8 team was the state champion in 2010), public speaking, mock trial (Fort Street was the 2009 New South Wales Champions), mooting (Fort Street was the winning team of the 2021 University of Western Sydney Kirby Cup), Tournament of Minds, Duke of Edinburgh's Award Scheme, theatresports, photography, and dance.

School traditions

Fort Street utilises a house system. The school is organised into five official houses, to which each student is assigned. The houses are named after prominent alumni of the school, each representing different areas of endeavour: Joshi, named after Nalini Joshi, the first female professor in the School of Mathematics and Statistics at the University of Sydney; Kirby, named after The Hon Michael Kirby AC CMG, former Justice of the High Court of Australia; Mawson, named after Douglas Mawson, Antarctic explorer; Preston, named after artist Margaret Preston; and Sheikh, named after Simon Sheikh, Australian activist and CEO of superannuation fund Future Super. Houses compete in sporting and academic endeavours for the Kennedy Cup, named after athlete Clarice Kennedy.

Since 1899, the school has published the Fortian magazine, the school's annual review and yearbook. The name later came to refer to all students of the schools past and present. An extensive alumni network is maintained through the school's alumni association, the Fortians' Union, formed by the amalgamation of the Old Boys' Union and the Fort Street Old Girls' Union. In addition to maintaining the alumni network, the Union also assists the school and promotes its traditions. It holds an annual dinner each October, with some student reunions held concurrently with this event. The Fortians' Union publishes Faber Est, a monthly newsletter.

An annual Speech Day is held near the beginning of each year at which student achievements are recognised and awards are presented. An address is given by a prominent Fortian. In the past, Speech Day events have been held at various venues, including the school's Memorial Hall and the Sydney Opera House. In recent years, the ceremony has been held at Sydney Town Hall.

Throughout its history, the various Fort Street schools have had a number of school songs. At present, at assemblies, the simply-named School Song which is Come Let the Strains resound that Echo Fort Street's Glory and Gaudeamus igitur are sung at the beginning of assemblies, with Fort Street's Name Rings Around the World sung as the recessional, at its conclusion.

FLOP, an annual student revue performed by outgoing Year 12 students, has been performed for many years, beginning in 1976. It usually involves humorous sketches, often parodying school life and teachers, and, in the digital era, the primary medium had been video. These are usually filmed in and out of class time after students' HSC Trial exams, taking place in early Term 3. These are shown during the graduation assembly - also known as FLOP. Musical pieces, both serious and funny, were once often performed. In its more recent years, various restrictions were imposed on FLOP, including a ban on the use of cars in videos, and a requirement for videos to not include swearing and nudity (a FLOP 2002 video involved a full length nudity scene). In 2010, FLOP was officially 'cancelled', however, in line with Fort Street students' long history of being a prominent source of progressive activism in Australia, the decision was fiercely contested by student-led protest groups and FLOP continued in its rebellious nature, including during 2021, when due to COVID-19, students were absent from school for most of their final term - when the filming takes place.

Fort Street community
Alumni

Fort Street alumni, as well as current attendees, are traditionally called "Fortians". Prominent former students include Australia's first Prime Minister, Edmund Barton, a Governor-General of Australia, and five justices of the High Court of Australia (including Michael Kirby), the highest number among government schools in Australia and the second highest among all schools in Australia. Fortians have also served as the President of the United Nations General Assembly (H. V. Evatt) and the President of the International Court of Justice (Percy Spender) (in each case, the only Australians to date to hold such positions), justices of the Supreme Court of New South Wales, Federal Court of Australia and other state and federal courts, Premiers of New South Wales, and Chancellors of the University of Sydney, the University of New South Wales and other universities. Among its graduates are also well known celebrities. In 2010, The Age reported that Fort Street High School ranked equal fourth among Australian schools based on the number of alumni who had received a top Order of Australia honour.

Fort Street Foundation

The Foundation was established by some Fortians of the class of 1949. The Foundation provides a means of raising funds for the school via a separate, incorporated entity. The Foundation administers three trust funds: Library and Building (tax deductible) and the Education Fund.

Parents and Citizens Association
The Parents and Citizens Association, or "P&C", is a forum where parents of students can participate in the governance of the school. Its goals including promoting support for public education, community awareness of the school, participation of parents, interaction with school staff, and general support for the school. The P&C supports improvement of the school's physical environment, communication through the Mercurius'' newsletter and the school website, and fundraising activities.

See also

 List of Government schools in New South Wales
 List of selective high schools in New South Wales
 List of Fortians

References

Notes 
: The hard copy article also published a table of the schools which were ranked in the top ten places, as follows: 
1st with 19 awardsScotch College, Melbourne  
2nd with 17 awardsGeelong Grammar School  
3rd with 13 awardsSydney Boys High School
equal 4th with 10 awards eachFort Street High School, Perth Modern School and St Peter's College, Adelaide
equal 7th with 9 awards eachMelbourne Grammar School, North Sydney Boys High School and The King's School, Parramatta
equal 10th with 6 awards eachLaunceston Grammar School, Melbourne High School, Wesley College, Melbourne and Xavier College.

Further reading

External links
 Fort Street High School website
 Foreword by Justice Kirby in the sesquicentenary book, Maroon and Silver

Educational institutions established in 1849
Public high schools in Sydney
Selective schools in New South Wales
1849 establishments in Australia
Petersham, New South Wales